Threewaters is a hamlet south of Nanstallon, Cornwall, England, United Kingdom.

References

Hamlets in Cornwall